Grzyb is a surname of Polish-language origin (meaning "fungus"). Notable people with the surname include:

Andrzej Grzyb (born 1956), Polish politician
Wojciech Grzyb  (born 1974), Polish footballer
Wojciech Grzyb (born 1981), Polish volleyball player

See also
 
Grzyb, village in Poland

 meaning = mushroom 

Polish-language surnames